Vivienne Acheampong is a British comedian and actress best known for playing Lucienne in the 2022 television production of The Sandman.

Career
Acheampong was a semi-finalist in the Funny Women Awards in 2013. Acheampong took her one woman comedy show to the Camden Fringe and the RADAR Festival, as well as the Edinburgh Fringe Festival.

Acheampong appeared from 2018 in three series of the BBC Comedy sketch series Famalam. Also in 2018, Acheampong provided a voice role for World of Warcraft: Battle for Azeroth. In 2020, she could be seen in the film adaptation of the Roald Dahl novel The Witches directed by Robert Zemeckis and starring Anne Hathaway. She also appeared in  the UK television series The One, and a couple more UK sketch comedy series The Emily Atack Show with Emily Atack, and Ellie & Natasia with the actress and comedians Ellie White and Natasia Demetriou.

For her role in the television production of The Sandman she received advice from Neil Gaiman, the author of the The Sandman graphic novel, when he advised that although the character Lucienne was a male character called Lucien in the original text she should trust in herself and that she had been chosen to play the role for a reason. Acheampong was unfamiliar with the story or the original comic book series prior to being cast in the role. Acheampong and The Sandman co-star Tom Sturridge guested on Empire magazine's The Pilot TV Podcast to discuss the production.

Personal life
Vivienne attended the BRIT School. She  has Ghanaian heritage and lives in London.

Filmography

References

External links
 

Living people
Actresses from London
British television actresses
English people of Ghanaian descent
21st-century English actresses
Year of birth missing (living people)